Denise Katrina Matthews (January 4, 1959 – February 15, 2016), known professionally as Vanity, was a Canadian singer, model, and actress. Known for her image as a sex symbol in the 1980s, she became an evangelist and renounced her career as Vanity in the 1990s.

Vanity was the lead singer of the female trio Vanity 6, which was created by the musician Prince. Known for their 1982 hit song "Nasty Girl", they disbanded in 1983, when she decided to embark on a solo career. Vanity released two solo albums on the Motown Records label, Wild Animal and Skin on Skin. She had minor hit singles with "Pretty Mess", "Mechanical Emotion", "Under the Influence", and "Undress" from the 1988 film Action Jackson. Vanity also had a successful career as an actress, starring in the film The Last Dragon, 52 Pick-Up, and Action Jackson.

After years of drug abuse, which caused health issues, Matthews became a born-again Christian in 1992. She later devoted herself to her church in Fremont, California. Matthews died on February 15, 2016, at age 57, due to kidney failure.

Early life 
Denise Katrina Matthews was born in Niagara Falls, Ontario on January 4, 1959, the daughter of Helga Senyk and Levia James Matthews. Her mother was of German-Jewish and Polish-Jewish descent, and she was born in Germany, while her father was of African-American descent and was born in Wilmington, North Carolina. Matthews had three sisters, Patricia, Deborah, Renay and several half siblings.

Her father died when she was 15 years old. Matthews revealed to Jet in 1993 that her father physically and verbally abused her for years. The abuse caused her to have a negative self-image. "For 15 years, he beat me badly... I wish I could see my father in heaven, but I won't. He's in hell," she said.

Career

Early career: 1977–1981 
Matthews began entering local beauty pageants before moving to Toronto, where she modeled. She won the Miss Niagara Hospitality title in 1977 and went on to compete for Miss Canada in 1978. At age 17, she moved to New York City to further her career. She signed with Zoli Model Agency. However, because she was short in stature, her modeling career was limited to commercials and photoshoots and excluded runway work. Vanity appeared in commercials for Pearl Drops toothpaste before completing a modeling stint in Japan. She also appeared on Nightlife Unlimited’s album cover Let's Do It Again (1980) 

Matthews had a small role in the horror movie Terror Train (1980), which was filmed in Montreal in 1979. She then went to Toronto to film the lead role in the B-movie Tanya's Island (1980). She was credited as D.D Winters for both films.

Music and acting career: 1982–1993 
Matthews appeared on the cover of the funk band Cameo's album cover, Alligator Woman, released in March 1982. She had met musician Prince at the American Music Awards earlier that year. After learning that she could sing, Prince later invited her to front a girl group he had formed called The Hookers. Prince initially wanted to name her "Vagina," pronounced "va-geen-na," but she refused so they settled on Vanity, as he considered her to be the female form of himself. The group was renamed Vanity 6. The group recorded one album, and had some success internationally with the single "Nasty Girl". They wore lingerie and Vanity's image became that of an erotic and sexy "nasty girl". "Prince created the whole Vanity 6 image. "It bothered me at the time. I lied and said it was the image I wanted. I did it because he told me I had to do it. If I didn't do it, I wouldn't get paid. I got into it. I wanted the old Diana Ross image," she said.

Vanity and Prince appeared on the cover of the April 28, 1983, issue of Rolling Stone magazine. In August 1983, she abruptly left the group and turned down a role in the 1984 film Purple Rain, which went to her replacement, Apollonia Kotero. In 1984, Vanity signed with Motown Records as a solo artist and recorded the funk-pop album Wild Animal. She had mild success on the US pop and R&B charts with the singles "Pretty Mess" and "Mechanical Emotion".

In 1985, Vanity made her mainstream film debut in The Last Dragon, which featured her song, "7th Heaven." She wanted a role in the 1985 film The Color Purple, but Steven Spielberg thought she looked too young. In 1986, she released her second and last album, Skin on Skin, which produced the top 10 R&B hit "Under the Influence". That year, she also starred in Never Too Young to Die opposite John Stamos and she appeared in 52 Pick-Up .

In 1987, Vanity guest-starred in an episode of Miami Vices third season. She went on to co-star in the 1988 film Action Jackson, her highest profile role, in which she starred opposite Carl Weathers, Craig T. Nelson, and Sharon Stone. She also appeared nude in the April 1988 issue of Playboy magazine.

Vanity had a role on numerous TV programs. She appeared in Friday the 13th: The Series in the episode entitled "Mesmer's Bauble" in 1989. She played a villain who tortured Nancy Allen's character in the 1990 TV movie Memories of Murder and appeared in an episode of Highlander: The Series in 1992. Her last role was in the film Kiss of Death in 1993.

Personal life

Relationships 
Reportedly, Matthews attended the American Music Awards with Rick James where she met Prince in January 1980. Matthews and Prince then began dating shortly after. She was linked romantically to Adam Ant, who wrote the track "Vanity" about her on his 1983 Strip album, and Billy Idol.

During an appearance on The Arsenio Hall Show in 1987, Matthews announced that she and Mötley Crüe bassist Nikki Sixx were engaged. She often joked that she would become Vanity 6 (Sixx) again. In his memoir, The Heroin Diaries: A Year in the Life of a Shattered Rock Star, Sixx detailed their volatile relationship and drug use. He stated that Vanity taught him how to freebase cocaine.

On her first anniversary of sobriety, Matthews married football player Anthony Smith of the Oakland Raiders in 1995. Matthews was working as an evangelist in San Jose when she read about Smith's philanthropic activities in Los Angeles. "The Lord told me that I would go down to L.A. and minister to him," she told Ebony. Three days after they met she proposed to him. They married after a one-month whirlwind romance. The wedding took place at Smith's home in Playa del Rey. Smith revealed that they often argued because of her kind nature. Matthews had a habit of inviting homeless people into their home for food and showers.  She often gave out their home number to complete strangers. Smith was volatile and their marriage ended in 1996. After they separated, Smith was arrested for domestic violence involving another woman and he was later convicted of three murders.

Religion
In 1992 Vanity met actor Sam J. Jones during the filming of Da Vinci's War. Jones invited Vanity to read the Bible with him during a lunch break. Shortly thereafter, Vanity became a born-again Christian, and in several interviews, she stated that she would not play any more sexualized roles. Simultaneously, she renounced her stage name Vanity and reverted to Denise Matthews. She traveled extensively throughout the South with her friend/agent Benjamin Jimerson-Phillips, giving her testimony of conversion to Christianity.

In 1994, Matthews was hospitalized for three months for near-fatal kidney failure from a drug overdose. She recalled later that after being rushed to the hospital, doctors said she had three days to live while on life support. She explained that Jesus appeared to her at this time and spoke to her, saying that if she promised to abandon her Vanity persona, he would save her.

Upon her recovery, Matthews ended her performing career by cutting off all ties with Hollywood and shunning her former life in show business. She devoted herself to being a born-again Christian. In 1995, she said, "When I came to the Lord Jesus Christ, I threw out about 1,000 tapes of mine— every interview, every tape, every video, everything." Jimerson-Phillips stated: "I was there at her apartment at The Grand in Sherman Oaks, when she just started dumping things down the incinerator. I grabbed some of the items including a painting titled Tailspin, by famed artist Olivia; a cassette hand painted by Prince of unreleased music; and an assortment of other items I didn't want to see go into the trash. I even had to go down to the office and ask them to retrieve her gold album she had thrown away."

After a kidney transplant in 1997, Matthews dedicated the rest of her life full-time to Christ. She made speaking engagements at churches worldwide and she headed Pure Hearts Ministries in Fremont, California.

In 2010, Matthews released her autobiography, Blame It On Vanity: Hollywood, Hell and Heaven.

Illness and death
Due to kidney problems from her decade-long cocaine addiction, Matthews had to undergo 20 minutes of peritoneal dialysis five times a day. Matthews underwent a kidney transplant in 1997, but her health worsened in 2015 after she was diagnosed with sclerosing encapsulating peritonitis.

Matthews died in a Fremont, California, hospital on February 15, 2016, from kidney failure, aged 57. She left much of her estate to her church. After  cremation, her ashes were scattered off the coast of Hawaii.

Discography

Studio albums
 Wild Animal (1984)
 Skin on Skin (1986)

Vanity 6
 Vanity 6 (1982)

Solo singles

Soundtrack appearances 
 1985: The Last Dragon; "7th Heaven"
 1988: Action Jackson; "Undress", "Faraway Eyes", and "Shotgun" with David Koz and featuring vocalist Kareem

Guest vocals
 1982: 1999, Prince; "Free" (backing vocals)
 1982: What Time Is It?, The Time; "The Walk" (spoken vocals)
 1986: El DeBarge, El DeBarge; "Secrets of the Night" (backing vocals)

Music videos
 1982: "Nasty Girl", "He's So Dull", and "Drive Me Wild"
 1984: "Pretty Mess"
 1985: "7th Heaven" (video clips were from the movie The Last Dragon)
 1986: "Under the Influence"
 1988: "He Turned Me Out", a song performed by The Pointer Sisters from the soundtrack of Action Jackson.  Vanity's co-star in the movie, Carl Weathers, appears alongside her in the video.

Filmography

Film

Television

See also
 List of people in Playboy 1980–1989

References

External links

Vanity Official website
 
 
 Denise "Vanity" Matthews from The Last Dragon Tribute
 

1959 births
2016 deaths
Actresses from Ontario
A&M Records artists
Black Canadian actresses
20th-century Black Canadian women singers
Canadian Christians
Canadian dance musicians
Canadian expatriate actresses in the United States
Female models from Ontario
Canadian film actresses
Canadian people of African-American descent
Canadian contemporary R&B singers
Canadian soul singers
Canadian television actresses
Converts to Christianity
Deaths from kidney failure
Geffen Records artists
Motown artists
Musicians from the Regional Municipality of Niagara
People from Niagara Falls, Ontario
Vanity 6 members
Musicians from the San Francisco Bay Area
Canadian people of Polish-Jewish descent
Canadian evangelists
Canadian women pop singers
Canadian people of German-Jewish descent
Feminist musicians
Kidney transplant recipients
Warner Records artists